David Obiosa was the first  Bishop of Ndokwa Diocese which is one of the 13 Dioceses in the Province of Bendel under the Church of Nigeria, Anglican Communion

Early life and education
Obiosa was born on August 23, 1963 to  Joseph and Victoria Obiosa of (née Umu-Emejulu) He attended Nnobia Primary School in Inyi, Nigeria and continued his studies at the Institute of Continuing Education in Kwale and Ebologu Grammar School, Utagba-Uno where he got his West Africa School certificate and General Certificate in Education (GCE) respectively. For his ordination training he schooled at the Trinity Theological College in Umuahia, where he earned his Diploma in Theology. At St. Paul’s College, Awka/University of Nigeria,Nsukka, He obtained a diploma in theology and a B.A (Hons). He earned a Masters Degree in Biblical Studies (Old Testament) at Crowther Graduate Theological Seminary, Abeokuta.

Ordination & Preferments 
The Rt. Rev'd. David obiosa was ordained a deacon on the 14th of July, 1991 by Rt. Rev. R.N.C. Nwosu, then, Bishop of Asaba. He was priested July 12, 1991  as above Preferred canon: May 2000 as above Preferred Archdeacon, May 2006 by Most Rev. Nicolas D. Okoh Then, Archbishop of Bendel Province & Bishop of Asaba

Consecration 
He was elected and consecrated as the Bishop of the Anglican Diocese of Ndokwa in May 2008 by the Most Rev'd Peter Akinola D. D. Then Archbishop, Metropolitan and Primate of all Nigeria. He was Enthroned as the first Bishop of the Anglican Diocese of Ndokwa, June 4, 2008 at the Cathedral Church of Christ Obiaruku.

Appointments 
Chaplain, Knights of St Christopher & Mary, Anglican Diocese of Asaba, 1998-2008.

Asaba Diocesan Communicator.

Member, Asaba Diocesan Board of Mission & Evangelism.

Member, Asaba Diocesan Bishop’s Examining Committee.

Member, Archbishop’s Advisory Committee, Anglican Diocese of Asaba.

Awards and Conferments 
On the 25th of November, 2021. The rank of General in the Missionary Army, Navy and Airforce Chaplaincy(MANAC) was conferred on the Rt. Rev'd. General David Obiosa.

Personal life
Obiosa was married to Joy Ifunanya Obiosa, with whom he had four children.

Death 
David Obiosa died on the 25th of October, 2022  at Delta State University Teaching Hospital, Oghara after a brief illness. He was 59 years old at the time of his death.

References

Living people
Anglican bishops of Ndokwa
21st-century Anglican bishops in Nigeria
Year of birth missing (living people)